Aundeck Omni Kaning First Nation is an Ojibway First Nation on Manitoulin Island, with their reserve at Sucker Creek 23. The First Nation is a member of the United Chiefs and Councils of Manitoulin and the Anishinabek Nation. They were formerly known as the Ojibways of Sucker Creek.

References

External links
 
 Aboriginal Affairs and Northern Development Canada profile

First Nations governments in Ontario
Ojibwe reserves in Ontario
Communities in Manitoulin Island